In the Polynesian mythology of Tonga, Limu is the primeval Tongan god of creation, whose union with the goddess Kele produced the goddess Touiafutuna, from whom all creation descends.

See also
Tongan mythology

References

Tongan deities
Creator gods